Stanley George McDonald Jr. (born August 28, 1935; died in May 2021) is a traditional jazz clarinetist, soprano saxophone and tuba player. He was one of the founding members of the New Black Eagle Jazz Band in 1971. Ten years later he founded the Blue Horizon Jazz Band.
 
He made numerous recordings with the New Black Eagles. In 1973 the recording "On the River" was nominated for an Emmy Award.

McDonald was listed as one of the top five soprano saxophone players in the world in a 1985 Mississippi Rag poll. He has played with Ralph Sutton, Tommy Benford, Buzzy Drootin, Ross Petot, Sammy Price, Benny Waters, Doc Cheatham, Dick Wetmore, Marty Grosz, and Scott Hamilton.

In 2010, McDonald was the subject of a three-part series entitled Visiting Stan McDonald on Dave Radlauer's Jazz Rhythm radio series. The program won a Gabriel Award in 2011.

Blue Horizon Jazz Band Discography:

 A Real Love Strong
 I Remember When
 Innside Track
 Dawn of the Blue Horizon Jazz Band
 Banned in Boston
 Classic Jazz Variations

References

 The Mississippi Rag, by George A. Borgman, February 2003, pages 1–9.

External links 
 Stan McDonald's Blue Horizon Jazz Band

Dixieland clarinetists
American jazz saxophonists
American male saxophonists
American jazz clarinetists
1935 births
Living people
21st-century American saxophonists
21st-century clarinetists
21st-century American male musicians
American male jazz musicians